Conquest is the act of military subjugation of an enemy by force of arms.

Conquest may also refer to:

History
 Early Muslim conquests
 Norman conquest of England, often referred to simply as "the Conquest"
 The Age of Conquistadors

Stage, film and television
 Conquest, a 1933 Broadway play starring Harvey Stephens
 Conquest (1928 film), an American aviation drama film
 Conquest (1937 film), a film starring Greta Garbo and Charles Boyer
 Conquest (1983 film), directed by Lucio Fulci
 Conquest (1998 film), a British-Canadian film
 Conquest (TV series), a History Channel series
 Conquest, a 1950s CBS news program hosted by Eric Sevareid

Music
 Conquest (Uriah Heep album), a 1980 album by rock band Uriah Heep
 Conquest (Dragon Fli Empire album), a 2004 hip hop album
 Conquest, a 1985 album by Brass Construction
 "Conquest" (song), a 1952 Corky Robbins song covered in 2007 by The White Stripes

Gaming
 Conquest of the New World, a turn-based strategy game made by Quicksilver Software in 1996
 Conquest (board game), a strategy board game by Donald Benge
 Duell (game), a chess variant, called Conquest in the UK
 Conquest: Frontier Wars, a 2001 real-time strategy computer game for the PC by Ubi Soft
 Civilization III: Conquests, a 2003 expansion for computer game Civilization III
 The Lord of the Rings: Conquest, a 2009 action game
 Conquest (play-by-mail game)

People
 Bryan Conquest (1930–2018), Australian politician
 John Tricker Conquest (1789–1866), British midwife and physician
 Norman Conquest (soccer) (1916–1968), Australian footballer
 Robert Conquest (1917–2015), British historian
 Stuart Conquest (born 1967), British chess grandmaster

Places
 Conquest, Saskatchewan, a Canadian village
 Conquest, New York, New York, an American town
 Houghton Conquest, a village in the United Kingdom

Transportation
 Chrysler Conquest, a rebadged Mitsubishi Starion sports car
 Conquest Airlines, a defunct commuter airline
 Carnival Conquest, a 2002 cruise ship
 Conquest class, a class of cruise ship operated by Carnival Cruise Line
 Cessna 425 "Conquest", a twin engine aircraft produced by Cessna Aircraft Company
 Cessna 441 Conquest II, a twin engine aircraft produced by Cessna Aircraft Company

Other uses 
 Conquest (Start-up Challenge), conclave organized by students at the Centre for Entrepreneurial Leadership, BITS Pilani 
 Conquest, one of the Four Horsemen of the Apocalypse in some interpretations of the book of Revelation
 CONQUEST, a linear scaling, or O(N), density functional theory electronic structure code
 ConQuesT, a science fiction convention in Kansas City, Missouri
 Conquest (comics), a Marvel Comics character
 Edge of Victory: Conquest, a novel by Greg Keyes
 Conquest X-30, a toy from the G.I. Joe: A Real American Hero toyline
 Conquest Racing, an American auto racing team
 Conquest Boys' clubs associated with ECyD
 Conquest Advisory, a financial services firm

See also

 Right of conquest, a former principle of international law
 
 Conquistador (disambiguation)
 Conqueror (disambiguation)
 Conquer (disambiguation)
 The Conquest (disambiguation)